Maja Savić (born ) is a Serbian volleyball player, playing as a middle-blocker. She is part of the Serbia women's national volleyball team. She won the bronze medal at the 2015 European Games in Baku. At club level she played for Vizura Belgrade in 2015.

References

1993 births
Living people
Serbian women's volleyball players
Sportspeople from Valjevo
Volleyball players at the 2015 European Games
European Games medalists in volleyball
European Games bronze medalists for Serbia
Serbian expatriate sportspeople in Poland
21st-century Serbian women